Turners Branch is a stream in Audrain County in the U.S. state of Missouri.

Turners Branch has the name of Gus Turner, an early settler.

See also
List of rivers of Missouri

References

Rivers of Audrain County, Missouri
Rivers of Missouri